was the 4th daimyō of Shibata Domain in Echigo Province, Japan (modern-day Niigata Prefecture). His courtesy title was Shinano-no-kami, and his Court rank was Junior Fifth Rank, Lower Grade.

Biography
Mizoguchi Shigekatsu was the eldest son of Mizoguchi Nobunao. He was received in formal audience by Shogun Tokugawa Iemitsu in 1640 and became daimyō in 1672 on the retirement of his father. In 1681 he was ordered to take possession of Takada Castle after the dispossession of Matsudaira Mitsunaga from Takada Domain, and in 1699 was ordered to oversee the construction of a new moat for Edo Castle in the Azabu area of the city. During his tenure at Shibata, Shigekatsu was noted as a patron of the arts, especially that of the Japanese tea ceremony. He completed the Shimizu-en gardens begun by his father.

He retired in 1706 and died in Edo in 1709.  His grave is at the temple of Kisshō-ji in Tokyo.

Shigekatsu was married to a daughter of Matsudaira Masatsuna of Tamanawa Domain, and after her death remarried to a daughter of Sakai Tadakatsu of Obama Domain. He had 4 sons and 7 daughters.

See also
Mizoguchi clan

References 
 "Shibata-han" on Edo 300 HTML ) 
 The content of much of this article was derived from that of the corresponding article on Japanese Wikipedia.

Tozama daimyo
1633 births
1708 deaths
Mizoguchi clan
People of Edo-period Japan